Sieghardt Rupp (14 June 1931 – 20 July 2015) was an Austrian actor who performed in film, television and theatre.

He made over 55 film and TV appearances beginning in 1959, with his career peaking in the 1960s. He became known for his performances in gangster or Western films in the 1960s where he typically portrayed a bandit or mercenary. His dark features, similar to those of his Italian co-stars meant that he could play Latin characters, such as Mexicans.

His most noted Western performance was his role as Esteban Rojo in Sergio Leone's 1964 production A Fistful of Dollars alongside Clint Eastwood and Gian Maria Volonté. He appeared in many other Westerns in the 1960s such as Blood at Sundown (1966) although he appeared in the romantic adventure Angelique and the Sultan in 1968.

During the 1970s, his film career diminished. However, he portrayed several TV characters afterwards, notably in Tatort as Investigator Kressin between 1971 and 1973. From 1985 he performed at the Theater in der Josefstadt in Vienna on stage. He retired from film and television acting in 1995. Rupp lived in Vienna towards the end of his life.

Selected filmography 

1959: Girls for the Mambo-Bar – Tommy Kersten 
1960:  – Franz Stadler
1960:  – Petros
1960:  – Prosecutor
1960:  – Fred Schantl, Verwalter
1961:  – Lauterbach
1961:  – Bruder Markus Burgmann
1962:  – Kurzweil
1962: Der Rote Rausch – Karl
1962: Lulu – Schwarz
1962: Waldrausch – Crispin Sagenbacher
1962: Mariandl's Homecoming – Deininger
1962: Wild Water – Markus Mautner
1962:  – Wirtssohn Georg
1962: The Forester's Daughter – Franz Földessy aka Rittmeister Franz Koltai
1963: The Lightship – Eugen
1963: Stop Train 349 – (uncredited)
1963: An Alibi for Death – Leopold Wasneck
1964: The Last Ride to Santa Cruz – Fernando
1964:  – Jack van Druten
1964: A Fistful of Dollars – Esteban Rojo 
1964: Condemned to Sin – Hermann Starosta
1964: Among Vultures – Preston
1965: Man Called Gringo – Reno
1965: Red Dragon – Pierre Milot 
1965:  – Abu Seif
1966:  – Nils Hansen
1966: I Am Looking for a Man – Direktor Voss
1966: Der Weibsteufel – Der Gendarm
1966:  – Captain Jason Conroy
1966: La Grande Vadrouille – Lt. Stuermer
1966: Blood at Sundown – Ralph
1967: Five Golden Dragons – Peterson
1967:  – Aslak
1967: Untamable Angelique – Millerand
1967:  – Gert Schneider
1968: Angelique and the Sultan – Millerand (uncredited)
1968: The Killer Likes Candy – Ali
1968:  – Rosmann
1968:  – Achims Vater
1969: The Seven Red Berets – Captain Brandt 
1969:  – Georg
1969: Heintje: A Heart Goes on a Journey – Günter Schelle
1969:  – Oberst
1969: Spion unter der Haube (TV film) – John Marple
1971: Heißer Sand (TV film) – Arthur Durban
1971: Tatort:  (TV) – Zollfahnder Kressin
1971: Tatort:  (TV) – Zollfahnder Kressin
1971: Tatort:  (TV) – Zollfahnder Kressin
1971:  – Rodrigo
1972: Tatort: Kressin und die Frau des Malers (TV) – Zollfahnder Kressin
1972: Tatort:  (TV) – Zollfahnder Kressin
1973: Dead Pigeon on Beethoven Street – Kressin
1973: Tatort: Kressin und die zwei Damen aus Jade (TV) – Zollfahnder Kressin
1974:  – Heller
1979: Breakthrough – Cpl. Rothe (uncredited)
1981: Der Bockerer – Herr Hermann
1983: Derrick: Lohmanns innerer Frieden (TV) – Werner Schorff
1984: Heinrich IV. (TV film) – Enrico
1985: Derrick: Gregs Trompete (TV) – Andreas Klinger
1987: Minna von Barnhelm (TV film) – Major von Tellheim
1987: Derrick: Nur Ärger mit dem Mann aus Rom (TV) – Ewald Scholler
1989: Professor Bernhardi (TV film) – Prof. Dr. Flint
1990: Weiningers Nacht – Leopold Weininger / Sigmund Freud
1990: Tatort: Seven Eleven (TV) – Ferdl Willek
1990: SOKO München: Mit letztem Einsatz (TV) – Rollauscher
1994: Etwas am Herzen (TV film) – Paul
1995: Die Spanische Fliege (TV film) – Ludwig Baumann (final film role)

References

External links and sources 
 

1931 births
2015 deaths
Austrian male film actors
Austrian male television actors
Male Spaghetti Western actors
Austrian male stage actors
Male Western (genre) film actors
20th-century Austrian male actors